Momme may refer to:

 Momme Andresen (1857–1951), German industrial research chemist
 Momme Peterson (1771–1835), Danish-Norwegian businessperson and politician
 A Japanese historic unit of weight: Japanese units of measurement#Momme; or units based on it:
 A unit of pearl weight: Pearl#Momme weight
 A unit of textile (silk) measurement, see Units of textile measurement#Momme
 Unit of several Japanese historic currencies originating from the value of silver weighed in momme  
 A proposed denomination of Japanese coinage from the Meiji period

See also
 San Mommè, an Italian village and hamlet (frazione) of the municipality of Pistoia, in the province of Pistoia, Tuscany